KMYY (92.3 FM, 92.3 "The Wolf") is a mainstream country music (90s to Now) formatted radio station broadcasting in the Monroe, Louisiana, United States radio market. It is owned by Stephens Media Group, through licensee SMG-Monroe, LLC.   Its studios are located in Monroe, and its transmitter is located west of Rayville.

92.3 The Wolf is home of the syndicated morning show Bobby Bones, heard weekdays 5am to 10am.  John Runyan 10am-3pm. Sheila Kay 3pm - 7pm 

KMYY Market Manager is Mike Downhour.

References

External links 
 

Radio stations in Louisiana
Mass media in Monroe, Louisiana
Country radio stations in the United States